= Tapso, Santiago del Estero =

Village in Santiago del Estero, Argentina

Coordinates: 28°24′S 65°07′W

Tapso
- Municipality and village
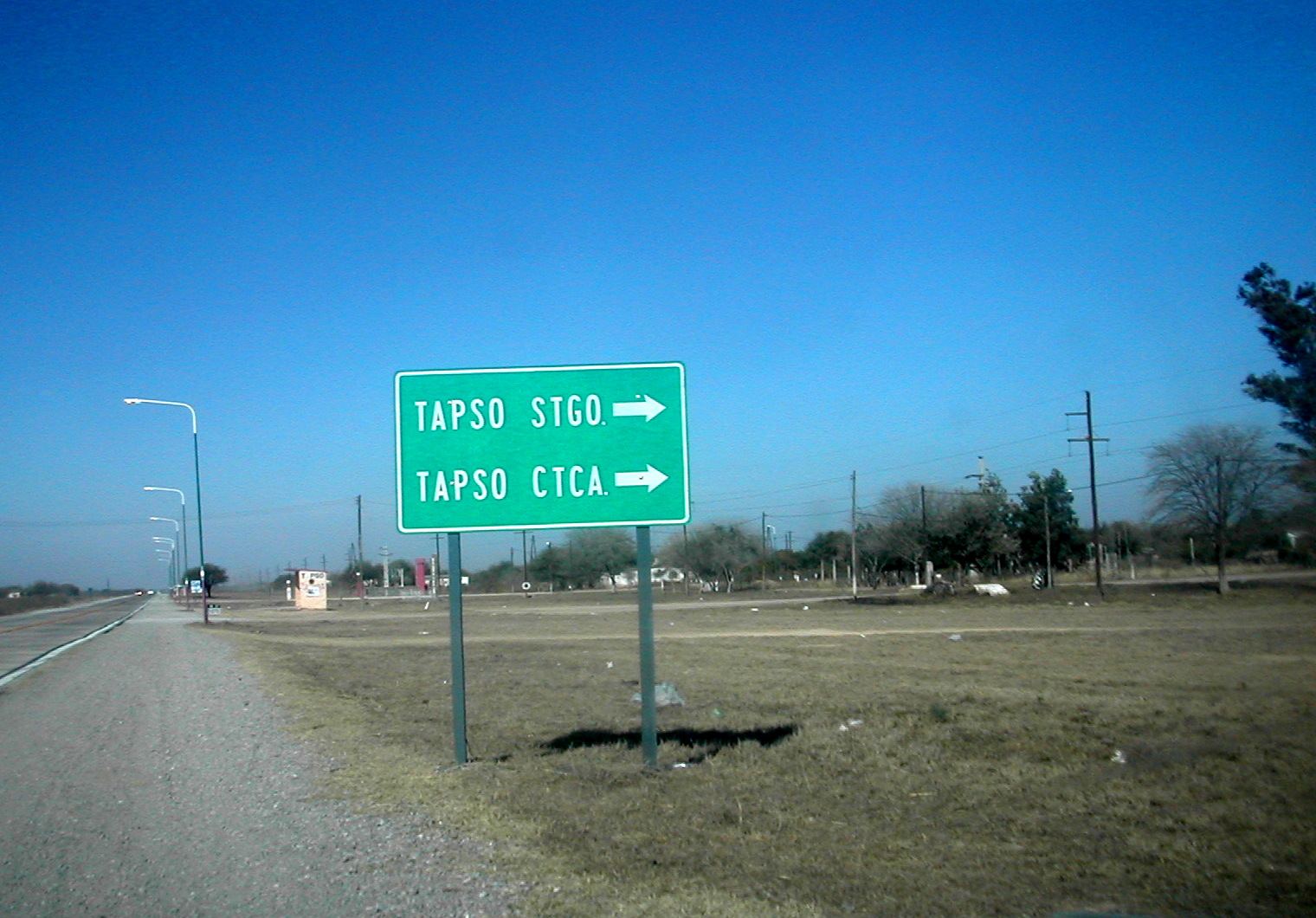
- Interactive map of Tapso
- Country: Argentina
- Province: Santiago del Estero
- Time zone: UTC−3 (ART)

Tapso is a municipality and village in Santiago del Estero in Argentina. It adjoins the village and municipality of Tapso in Catamarca. It had 191 inhabitants according to the 2010 Census.
